Desmarella moniliformis is a species of choanoflagellata belonging to the family Salpingoecidae.

The species is found in the northern parts of the Atlantic and north eastern parts of the Pacific near the United Kingdom, Belgium, and Sweden.

References 

Craspedida